Messe in G is a mass in G major by the English composer Christopher Tambling. He composed it in 2013, scored for mixed choir, orchestra and organ. It was first published in 2014.

Tambling, a church musician and music pedagogue, was described as "a great believer in making church music accessible". He set the Latin text of the mass ordinary, without the Credo, which makes it a formally a short mass or missa brevis. He dedicated it to the church St. Cyriakus in Schwäbisch Gmünd-Bettringen. The mass was first published in 2014 by Dr. J. Butz.

The mass is structured in five movements, omitting a Credo:

 Kyrie (Moderato molto)
 Gloria (Alla marcia)
 Sanctus (Maestoso)
 Benedictus (Moderato)
 Agnus Dei (Andantino)

It is scored for mixed choir and orchestra including organ. A version with only organ accompaniment is also available. The congregation can optionally sing the theme of the Gloria, which is repeated throughout the movement, framing passages that express the different aspects of the text in contrasting character. The theme is unison, and also several other phrases, such as men only for "Domine Deus" (Lord God), women only for "Domine Fili" (Lord Son). For most of the mass, the tenor part is the same as the bass, and marked as optional.

The mass, like his other sacred music, is popular in Germany.

References

External links 
 Messe in G (2013) / Kyrie - Gloria - Sanctus - Agnus Dei musicanet.org

Tambling
2013 compositions